Nicholas D. Chabraja (pronounced cha-brah-ya) (born November 6, 1942 in Gary, Indiana) is a Serbian - American lawyer and former chief executive officer of General Dynamics Corporation.

Career
In 1967 he got a law degree from the Northwestern University. He was then employed by the Jenner & Block law firm in which he stayed for almost thirty years, from 1968 to 1997. In this first and longest period of his career, he also served as a Special Counsel for the United States House of Representatives. He also held counseling positions for General Dynamics, being a Senior Vice President and Counsel from 1993 to 1994, and a Vice-Chairman from 1996 to 1997.

In 1997 he was appointed a Chief Executive Officer of General Dynamics, a position which he held for twelve years, stepping down from his office on June 30, 2009. This makes Nicholas Chabraja the longest-serving Chief Executive Officer of the top five defense contractors, the others being Lockheed Martin, Northrop Grumman, Boeing, and Raytheon. Under his management, General Dynamics grew rapidly, mainly through acquisitions: from $4 billion in sales and 29,000 employees to $29.3 billion in sales and 92,900 employees in 2008. In 2008, Nicholas D. Chabraja earned a total compensation of $17,962,579, which included a base salary of $1,375,000, a cash bonus of $4,500,000, stocks granted worth $3,756,556, options granted worth $7,926,420, and other compensation worth $404,603. In 2009, he was included in the list of the 24 "TopGun CEOs" in the US, published by Brendan Wood International, an advisory agency.

He is also a member of the Lambda Chi Alpha fraternity.

References

External links
 General Dynamics
 General Dynamics Board of Directors
 Highest paid defense contractor CEOs
 

Living people
General Dynamics
1942 births
American chief executives
American people of Serbian descent
People from Gary, Indiana
People associated with Jenner & Block